Missing Years is the fifth studio album by the American country music band Little Texas. Released in 2007 on Montage Music Group, it is the band's first studio album for that label, and its first new studio album since 1997's Little Texas. It is also the first studio album not to feature former co-lead vocalists Brady Seals and Tim Rushlow. Here, lead guitarist Porter Howell serves as lead vocalist, and the other three remaining members (drummer Del Gray, rhythm guitarist Dwayne O'Brien, and bass guitarist Duane Propes) are retained.

Overall, this album produced three singles in "Your Woman", the title track, and "Party Life". While neither "Your Woman" nor "Party Life" charted, "Missing Years" reached number 45 on the Hot Country Songs charts in 2007, giving the band its first chart single in ten years.

Track listing
"Gotta Get Me Down Home" (Quinn Loggins) - 3:03
"Missing Years" (Del Gray, Porter Howell, Dwayne O'Brien) - 4:12
"Rebel" (Gray, Howell, Templeton Thompson) - 3:46
"Knees" (Marc Beeson, Don Pfrimmer) - 3:48
"A Reason" (Gray, Howell) - 4:16
"Party Life" (Gray, Howell, O'Brien) - 2:55
"Texas 101" (Howell, Johnny Slate, Paul Jefferson) - 4:00
"So Long" (Anthony Smith, Liz Hengber, James Dean Hicks) - 4:18
"When He's Gone" (Gray, Howell, O'Brien) - 4:04
"You Ain't Seen Me Lately" (Gray, Howell, O'Brien) - 3:46
"Your Blues" (Angelo Petraglia, Brett James) - 3:38
"Your Woman" (Jon McElroy, Del Gray) - 3:49

Personnel

Little Texas
Del Gray – drums
Porter Howell – electric guitar, lead vocals
Dwayne O'Brien – acoustic guitar, background vocals
Duane Propes – bass guitar, background vocals

Additional musicians
Eric Darken – box, percussion
Dan Dugmore – acoustic guitar, electric guitar, steel guitar
Russ Pahl – acoustic guitar, steel guitar

Strings by the Nashville String Machine, arranged by Kris Wilkinson.

2007 albums
Little Texas (band) albums
Montage Music Group albums